Marília Chaves Peixoto (24 February 1921 – 5 January 1961) was a Brazilian mathematician and engineer who worked in dynamical systems. Peixoto was the first Brazilian woman to receive a doctorate in mathematics and the first Brazilian woman to join the Brazilian Academy of Sciences.

Early life and education 
Marília Magalhães Chaves was born on 24 February, 1921, in Sant'Ana do Livramento, and later moved to Rio de Janeiro. In 1939 she enrolled at the  Escola Nacional de Engenharia (National School of Engineering), working alongside Leopoldo Nachbin and Maurício Peixoto (who she would later marry).

Career
Peixoto graduated from the Federal University of Rio de Janeiro in 1943 with a degree in engineering, having also studied mathematics at the university and acted as a monitor for the university's National Faculty of Philosophy. In 1948, she received a doctorate in mathematics, and began teaching at the Escola Politécnica da UFRJ.

Following her work on convex functions, Peixoto was appointed an associate member of the Brazilian Academy of Science on 12 June 1951. She was the first Brazilian woman to join the organization, and the second woman after Marie Curie, a foreign associate of the academy.

Peixoto married Maurício Peixoto in 1946. The couple jointly published "Structural Stability in the plane with enlarged boundary conditions" in 1959, one of several papers which led to Peixoto's theorem.

Personal life
Peixoto had two children, Marta and Ricardo, with Maurício Peixoto.

References

1921 births
1961 deaths
People from Santana do Livramento
20th-century Brazilian mathematicians
20th-century women engineers
20th-century Brazilian engineers
Brazilian women mathematicians